The following highways are numbered 31E:

United States
 U.S. Route 31E
 New York State Route 31E

See also
List of highways numbered 31